Female Unnikrishnan is a 2015 Malayalam language film produced by Shijoy kv. The film stars Suraj Venjaramood, Anoop Menon and  Mahalakshmi in the lead roles along with  Jagadish, Salim Kumar, Devan, Maniyan Pilla Raju and Bijukuttan. The film is directed by K B Madhu, while the music is composed by Shaji Sukumaran. The screenplay is based on a story written by Sudheesh John.

Plot 
The film is about the story of a man named Unnikrishnan who has a female voice. He is insulted by the whole village because of his deformity. He tries many ways to overcome his problem but all goes in vain. Therefore, he is not able to move forward in society and achieve his ambitions. The film revolves around his self realisation.  Later Dravyan gets him married to a very rich woman who is mute. He finds that she had been rendered speechless after an incident that also involved her prospective groom. This makes a lot of changes in his life. This is portrayed in a very comical way in this film.

Cast 

Suraaj Venjarammoodu as Unnikrishnan
  Mahalakshmi 
Bijukuttan                
 Devan                
Jagadish
 Maniyanpilla Raju                
 Kalaranjini                
 Salim Kumar                
 Kulappulli Leela                
 Anoop Menon                
 Nelson
 Dinesh Panicker
 Kochu Preman

Soundtrack 
The film's music is composed by Shaji Sukumaran along with K S Chitra, Jassie Gift and Vijay Yeshudas

 "Ayalathe" – Rajalakshmi, Vijay Yesudas
 "Gopimurali" – K S Chitra        
 "Gopimurali" – Josesagar
 "Kaathoram" – Jeethu Ramachandran        
 "Konjathe" – Jassie Gift

References 

2015 films
2010s Malayalam-language films